Ferriby railway station serves the village of North Ferriby in the East Riding of Yorkshire, England. The station, and all trains serving it, are operated by Northern. It has a slightly unusual layout, in that the eastbound platform is located on the main running line but the westbound one is on a loop which continues on towards .

Facilities
It is unstaffed, but has ticketing facilities, so passengers do not need to buy tickets in advance of travel or on the train.  The main buildings are now privately owned, but there are shelters on both platforms and a footbridge linking them. Train running details are provided by information screens, timetable posters and telephone.  Step-free access is available to both platforms.

Services
The station has a basic hourly service in each direction on weekdays (with extras at peak times), provided by the Hull to Doncaster stopping trains. Some Hull-bound trains continue toward Bridlington, whilst a small number of York trains call during the weekday peaks.

There is a very limited service (two eastbound and three westbound trains) on Sundays.

References

External links

Railway stations in the East Riding of Yorkshire
DfT Category F2 stations
Railway stations in Great Britain opened in 1840
Northern franchise railway stations
Former Hull and Selby Railway stations